Reinheim is a railway station in Reinheim, Hesse, Germany.

History
The station was opened on 15 May 1871, and was a terminus until Wiebelsbach railway station was opened on 15 July 1871. In 2007, the station was renovated at a cost of €900,000.

The station

The station is located on the Odenwald railway (Darmstadt – Wiebelsbach) and is served by RB services operated by VIAS.

Train services
The following services currently call at Reinheim:

References

Railway stations in Hesse
Railway stations in Germany opened in 1871
Buildings and structures in Darmstadt-Dieburg